The Brandenburger Gold Coast, later Prussian Gold Coast, was a part of the Gold Coast. The Brandenburg colony existed from 1682 to 1721, when King Frederick William I of Prussia sold it for 7,200 ducats and 12 Black slaves to the Dutch West India Company.

Brandenburger Gold Coast 
In May 1682 the German colonization of Africa began when the newly founded Brandenburg African Company (German: Brandenburgisch-Afrikanische Compagnie (de), which had been granted a charter by Frederick William, Elector of Brandenburg (core of the later Prussian kingdom), established a small West African colony consisting of two Gold Coast settlements on the Gulf of Guinea, around Cape Three Points in present Ghana:

 Groß Friedrichsburg, also called Hollandia, now Pokesu: (1682–1717), which became the capital
 Fort Dorothea, also called Accada, now Akwida: (April 1684–1687, 1698–1711, April 1712–1717), which in 1687–1698 the Dutch occupied

German governors during the Brandenburger era 
 May 1682–1683 – Philip Peterson Blonck
 1683–1684 – Nathaniel Dillinger
 1684–1686 – 
 1686–1691 – Johann Niemann

Prussian Gold Coast 
On 15 January 1701, the small colony was renamed Prussian Gold Coast Settlements, in connection with the founding of the Prussian kingdom, which formally took place three days later, when Frederick III, Elector of Brandenburg and Duke of Prussia, crowned himself King in Prussia (after which he became known as Frederick I of Prussia).

From 1711 to April 1712 the Dutch occupied Fort Dorothea again. In 1717 the colony was physically abandoned by Prussia, so that from 1717 to 1724 John Konny (in Dutch: Jan Conny) was able to occupy Groß Friedrichsburg, from 1721 in opposition to Dutch rule.

In 1721 the rights to the colony were sold to the Dutch, who renamed it Hollandia, as part of their larger Dutch Gold Coast colony.

Governors during the Prussian era 
 1701–1704 – Adriaan Grobbe
 1704–1706 – Johann Münz
 1706–1709 – Heinrich Lamy
 1709–1710 – Frans de Lange
 1710–1716 – Nicholas Dubois
 1716–1717 – Anton Günther van der Menden

See also 
 Princes Town, Ghana
 German colonial projects before 1871

References 

 World Statesmen.org: Ghana
 Accada and Hollandia:  pg. 252. New Cambridge Modern History Atlas, H.C. Darby and Harold Fullard

External links 
 Grossfriedrichsburg.de – (mostly in German language).
Grossfriedrichsburg, a German colony in Ghana? (short documentary video)

German colonisation in Africa
History of Ghana
Former colonies in Africa
Former German colonies
Brandenburg-Prussia
Chartered companies
History of West Africa
1682 establishments in Africa
1721 disestablishments in Africa
1682 establishments in the Holy Roman Empire
1720s disestablishments in Prussia